Trails in Omaha, Nebraska include  of paved trails as well as unpaved trails and paths for recreational usage throughout the city. Popular among bicyclists, runners, hikers and recreational walkers, these trails are included in comprehensive plans for the City of Omaha, the Omaha metro area, Douglas County, and long-distance coordinated plans between the municipalities of southeast Nebraska.

History

In 1887 the Omaha Bicycling Club was responsible for expanding Athletic Park at North 20th and Lake Streets to include a bicycle racing track, and there were other early trails throughout the city. However, Omaha was completely devoid of trails for several years during the 20th century leading up to early 1989.

On September 28, 2008, the trails in Omaha were connected to trails in Council Bluffs, Iowa by way of the new Bob Kerrey Pedestrian Bridge.

Benefits of the trails
A recent study focused on the benefits of Omaha's trails found that respondents generally perceive the trails to be economic benefits, with almost two-thirds of those surveyed reporting the trails would increase the selling price of their home. There is no widespread concern for safety issues on the trails, as trespassing, theft and vandalism by trail users are relatively infrequent events. A large majority of residents living along the trails think there is a positive relationship between the trails and neighborhood quality of life.

Future development
There are many plans for the trails in Omaha. A local organization is calling for more east-west connecting trails, as most of the city east of 72nd Street has few trails of note. There are also plans to connect Omaha to the MoPac Trail running east from Lincoln on a system called the Mo-Pac East Trail. Currently extending northeast towards over the Platte River on the Lied Platte River Trail Bridge near South Bend, the trail will eventually connect with the 144th Street Trail.

The trails are also included in a plan called the Quad State Trail Project. This plan envisions linking numerous cities in Nebraska, Iowa, Kansas and Missouri, including connecting Omaha to St. Louis, Kansas City, Topeka and Lincoln via  of trails, 450 of which already exist.

Trails

See also
 Parks in Omaha
 Omaha Belt Line

References

Bibliography
 Greer, D.L. (2000) Omaha Recreational Trails: Their Effect on Property Values and Public Safety. University of Nebraska at Omaha. Retrieved 9/20/07.
 RDG Martin Shukert and Ciaccio Dennell Group. (1994) A Network of Discovery: A Comprehensive Trails Plan for the State of Nebraska. Nebraska Energy Office and the Nebraska Department of Economic Development.

External links
 Omaha Bike Map
 OmahaTrails.com
 Parks and trails in Omaha – University of Nebraska at Omaha website.
 Omaha Area Trail Map.
 Midwest Cycling Community website.
 Trails Have Our Respect (THOR) website.

Transportation in Omaha, Nebraska
Tourist attractions in Omaha, Nebraska
Geography of Omaha, Nebraska
 
 
 
Protected areas of Douglas County, Nebraska